Shuiyuan may refer to:

 Shuiyuan, Guangxi, a town in Huanjiang Maonan Autonomous County, Guangxi, China. 

 , a town in Dashiqiao, Liaoning, China.

 , a town in Yongchang County, Gansu, China.